Finn Kobberø (13 March 1936 – 21 January 2009) was a badminton player from Denmark, who won numerous  international titles in all of badminton's three events (singles, doubles, and mixed doubles) from the mid-1950s to the mid-1960s.

Career
He was one of the most successful players in the history of the All England Open Badminton Championships with 15 titles between 1955 and 1966, 7 in men's doubles, mainly with hard-hitting Jorgen Hammergaard Hansen, and 8 in mixed doubles. He was also a three-time singles finalist at the All-Englands despite a storied disdain for physical conditioning. A leading player on all of Denmark's Thomas Cup (men's international) teams from 1954 through 1964, he won 55 of 64 individual matches. Powerful, quick, and deceptive, he has been rated among the most talented players in the sport's history. He won 22 Danish national championships in all. He also won each of the three events at the Danish Open Championships though the tournament was not held during most of the years that he was active as a player.

Kobberø was inducted into the Badminton Hall of Fame in 1997. He later worked as a sports journalist for national television in Denmark. He died January 21, 2009.

Achievements

International tournaments 
Men's doubles

References

Finn Kobberø's Profile - Badminton.dk

1936 births
2009 deaths
Danish male badminton players